Whiz Comics was an anthology comic book series published by former American comic book publishing company, Fawcett Publications between February 1940 until June 1953. It is widely known for being the comic run in which hugely popular superhero character Captain Marvel (Shazam) made his debut.

Publication history 
In 1939, Fawcett Publications was trying to capitalize on the ongoing superhero boom spearheaded by characters like Superman and Batman. It was then that writer Bill Parker came up with the idea for a team of superheroes, each possessing the power of a different mythical character. The idea was eventually modified into a single character with all these powers, and thus Captain Marvel, known later as Shazam, was born. The first issue published of Whiz Comics was issue #2, published with a cover-date of Feb. 1940. Fawcett created two black-and-white ashcan #1 issues to solicit advertisers and to secure the copyrights to the material. The two copies were identical but carried different titles: Flash Comics and Thrill Comics; the Captain Marvel character was called "Captain Thunder" in a near-identical story. When Fawcett went to press with the magazine, the first issue was retitled as Whiz Comics, a name inspired by the company's bawdy humor magazine, Captain Billy's Whiz Bang. Further complicating matters, when they got to issue #3, Fawcett, through either mistake or intent, used the number twice. Whiz Comics 3(A) was released 12 Jan 1940 and Whiz Comics 3(B) was released 23 Feb 1940. Thus, if viewed from the perspective of the second #3 (and, therefore, all the issues that followed it), Whiz #2 unofficially became Whiz #1.

The cover art for the first issue showed Captain Marvel throwing a vehicle at a wall, and was inspired by the cover of Action Comics #1, which shows Superman lifting a car. The first issue was written by Bill Parker, who also wrote several other issues before Whiz became popular and other writers were hired. 

Throughout its run, Captain Marvel continued to be the star attraction of Whiz Comics, with his sales surpassing that of DC stalwarts like Batman (Detective Comics and Batman) and Superman (Action Comics and Superman). With half a dozen spin-offs, the honor of being the first superhero to appear on film in addition to Captain Marvel and Whiz Comics were outselling Superman by a huge margin it was clear Fawcett had the edge. DC was not pleased at having these sales losses and loss of the title of first superhero motion picture. Thus in 1941 DC sued Fawcett Publications over the allegations that Captain Marvel was a rip-off of Superman and a copyright violation. The lawsuit lasted 12 years and finally got settled with DC Comics winning and Fawcett having to pay $400,000 in repercussions and immediately cease Whiz Comics to stop publishing anything about Captain Marvel. With this ended the 13-year run of Whiz Comics. The name 'Captain Marvel' was shortly trademarked by then up and coming company Marvel Comics and in 1972 DC bought all the creative rights of Fawcett publication's superheroes. Fawcett's and DC's Captain Marvel has since been renamed SHAZAM to avoid trademark infringement. Some Whiz Comics issues are now in the public domain and can be freely accessed through the internet.

Recurring features 
Whiz contained the following features depicting adventures of various superhero characters:
 Captain Marvel
 Ibis the Invincible
 Spy Smasher
 Golden Arrow
 Dan Dare
 Lance O'Casey
 Scoop Smith

References

Notes

Sources consulted 

 Will Eisner's "Shop Talk" book.

Fawcett Comics titles
Golden Age comics titles
Comics magazines published in the United States
1940 comics debuts
1953 comics endings
Magazines established in 1940
Magazines disestablished in 1953